Lunas is a commune in the Hérault department in southern France.

It is situated on the D35 between Lodève and Bédarieux.

Geography

Climate
Lunas has a warm-summer mediterranean climate (Köppen climate classification Csb).

Population

See also
Communes of the Hérault department

References

External links

Official site

Communes of Hérault